Adler or Adlerwerke vormals Heinrich Kleyer (‘Adler Works formerly [known as] Heinrich Kleyer’) was a German aircraft manufacturer established by Heinrich Kleyer in Frankfurt am Main in 1934 by buying out Gerner. Adler made no original designs, only continuing production of Gerner designs that were included in the acquisition.

Adler was also known as an automobile manufacturer, producing cars under the Adler name from 1899 to 1945, as well as a bicycle manufacturer from 1886 on. Adler was also a well-known typewriter and office machine manufacturer from 1898.

In 1969 Adler was acquired by Litton Industries.

The factory in Frankfurt-Gallus still exists and was restored in the late 1990s for use as an office building. It also houses the Gallustheater and a restaurant.

Defunct aircraft manufacturers of Germany
History of Frankfurt
Manufacturing companies based in Frankfurt
German companies established in 1934